Escape from the Dungeons of the Gods is a single-player text adventure written by Ray Sato for the TRS-80. The original and versions for the Atari 8-bit family and Apple II were published in the August 1982 issue of SoftSide.  It was subsequently republished in The Best of SoftSide (1983) and released on accompanying 5¼-inch floppy disks.

References

External links 
 

1980s interactive fiction
1982 video games
Apple II games
Atari 8-bit family games
Commercial video games with freely available source code
SoftSide games
TRS-80 games
Video games developed in the United States